Shiloh Season is a 1999 film directed by Sandy Tung and starring Zachary Browne. It serves as a film sequel to the 1997 film Shiloh, which was adapted from the book by the same name by Phyllis Reynolds Naylor.

Plot
Judd is upset that Shiloh (his former hunting dog) now belongs to Marty. In the first film, Marty did hard labor to get Shiloh from Judd. Judd starts drinking more heavily and almost runs Marty and Shiloh off the road with his truck. Marty encounters Judd several times, including one key moment when Marty and his friend David Howard spy on Judd from behind a tree in front of his house.

Later, Judd crashes his truck into the creek while driving drunk. Shiloh's loud barking gets Marty's attention, and he finds Judd. Judd is taken to the hospital and returns home sometime later. Marty wants to be nice with Judd and makes donations of bread and meat. Marty then starts writing Judd letters, telling him stories about Shiloh. Judd reads them and starts to bond with Marty.

In the end, Marty decides he wants to take Shiloh with him to visit Judd. Marty and Judd start to become friends. Judd starts to gets close with his dogs and he lets them come inside when it starts to rain.

Cast 
 Michael Moriarty as Raymond "Ray" Preston
 Scott Wilson as Judd Travers
 Zachary Browne as Martin "Marty" Preston
 Ann Dowd as Louise "Lou" Preston
 Caitlin Wachs as Dara Lynn Preston
 Rachel David as Rebecca "Becky" Preston
 Rod Steiger as Doc Wallace
 Bonnie Bartlett as Mrs. Wallace
 Marissa Leigh as Samantha "Sam" Wallace
 Joe Pichler as David Howard
 Frannie as Shiloh
 John Short as Mr. Howard

Reception 
The film holds a rating of 70% on Rotten Tomatoes, based on 20 reviews with an average score of 6.6/10.

References

External links
 

1999 films
1999 drama films
American children's drama films
American sequel films
Films scored by Joel Goldsmith
Films about dogs
Films based on children's books
Films about pets
Warner Bros. films
1990s English-language films
1990s American films